Eleonora Kodele (born 16 October 1998) is a Slovenian handball player who plays for ŽRK Celje and the Slovenia national team.

References
 

  
1998 births
Living people
Handball players from Ljubljana
Slovenian female handball players
Competitors at the 2018 Mediterranean Games
Mediterranean Games bronze medalists for Slovenia
Mediterranean Games medalists in handball
21st-century Slovenian women